The R boats (Räumboote in German, meaning minesweeper) were a group of small naval vessels built as minesweepers for the Kriegsmarine (German navy) before and during the Second World War. They were used for several purposes during the war, and were also used post-war by the German Mine Sweeping Administration for clearing naval mines.

In 1954, the Indonesian Navy ordered 10 Pulau Rau-class minesweepers to Abeking & Rasmussen in West Germany. The Pulau Rau-class were modified R boats armed with one Bofors 40mm L/60 Mk 3 gun, two Oerlikon 20mm/70 Mk 10 guns and also mechanical minesweeping gear.

Operational use 
A total of 424 boats were built for the Kriegsmarine before and during World War II. The German Navy used them in every theatre including the Baltic, Mediterranean, the Arctic and the Black Sea. In addition to its designed use as minesweepers, these boats were used for convoy escort, coastal patrol, minelaying and air-sea rescue.

About 140 R boats survived the war and these were distributed amongst the Allies. Some were used by the German Mine Sweeping Administration (GMSA) to clear western Europe of naval mines. Twenty-four boats were transferred back to the post-war German Navy, the Bundesmarine, in 1956 and were used until the late 1960s. An unusual feature of these ships is the use of Voith Schneider Propellers on approximately one quarter of the boats for extra maneuverability.

Additionally, dozens of captured vessels from France, United Kingdom, the Netherlands and Italy were used as foreign R-boats (R-boote Ausland) and were designated with RA-, RH- and RD- prefixes. A further 8 coastal motor fishing boats were designated as auxiliary R-boats and named R111-R118 in the 11th R-boat flotilla.

R boat classes

R boat units 

In the inter-war years and during the Second World War, a total of twenty Räumboots-Flottille (German for "Minesweeper Flotillas") were created. While most were dissolved late in the war or after the German surrender, a few were kept for use by the German Mine Sweeping Administration (GMSA) and dissolved post-war. An additional flotilla was created in the immediate post-war, also for use by the GMSA.

Gallery

See also
 Schnellboot, known to the Allies as E-Boats
 Motor Launch for the British equivalents
 M-class minesweeper (Germany) for larger German World War 2 minesweepers
 Sperrbrecher for another type of German World War 2 minesweeper

References

Notes

Bibliography 
 
 Conway's All The World's Fighting Ships 1922–1946
 
 Hervieux, Pierre "German Motor Minesweepers at War 1939–1945" in Warship 2002–2003, Conway's Maritime Press
 Lenton, H. T. German Warships of the Second World War. London: Macdonald and Jane's, 1975. .

Online sources 
 R Boat at German Navy.de
  Räumboots-Flottillen at Lexikon der Wehrmacht.de

Further reading 
 

Boat types
Mine warfare vessel classes
Minesweepers of the Kriegsmarine
 
 
Cold War minesweepers of Germany